The Shire of Monto was a local government area in the northern catchment of the Burnett River, Queensland, Australia.

History
The Monto district came into being as part of a Land Development Scheme for returning soldiers. The first town buildings were erected in 1926, followed by the Butter Factory in 1927. In July 1931 the railway was officially opened and on 3 March 1932, the Shire of Monto was proclaimed on land previously administered by the Shires of Eidsvold and Mundubbera. The town of Monto also briefly served as the administrative centre of Eidsvold.

On 15 March 2008, under the Local Government (Reform Implementation) Act 2007 passed by the Parliament of Queensland on 10 August 2007, the Shire of Monto merged with the Shires of Biggenden, Eidsvold, Gayndah, Mundubbera and Perry to form the North Burnett Region.

Towns and localities
The Shire of Monto included the following settlements:

 Bancroft
 Bukali
 Cania
 Cannindah
 Coominglah
 Coominglah Forest
 Glenleigh
 Harrami
 Kalpowar
 Kapaldo
 Langley
 Monal
 Monto
 Moonford
 Mulgildie
 Mungungo
 Rawbelle
 Selene
 Splinter Creek
 Tellebang
 Three Moon
 Ventnor

Chairmen
 1964—1970: Lindsay Earle Hartwig

Population

References

Former local government areas of Queensland
2008 disestablishments in Australia
Populated places disestablished in 2008